Midgley is an English surname which originates from the placename of Midgley, near Mytholmroyd, Yorkshire. Notable people with the name include:

Thomas Midgley (footballer) (1856–1957), British professional footballer
Waldo Midgley (1888–1986), American artist, including as a depictor of the Black Rock of the Great Salt Lake
Thomas Midgley Jr. (1889–1944), American mechanical and chemical engineer
Harry Midgley (1893–1957), British politician
 The Midgley family, a British family of opera singers:
 Gladys Midgley (1911–2005) soprano singer
 Walter Midgley (1914–1980) operatic tenor
 Vernon Midgley (born 1940), tenor singer
 Maryetta Midgley (born 1942), soprano singer
Mary Midgley (1919–2018), British philosopher of ethics and animal rights
G. C. J. Midgley (1921–1997), British philosopher of language 
Roger Midgley (1924–2019) British field hockey player
Robin Midgley (1934–2007), British theatre, television and radio director 

Craig Midgley (born 1976), English football manager and former player
Hannah Midgley (born 1993), British actress

References

English-language surnames
Surnames of English origin
Surnames of British Isles origin